Macrothele cretica is a species of spiders in the family Macrothelidae. It is endemic to Greece.

Sources

Macrothelidae
Spiders of Europe
Endemic fauna of Crete
Spiders described in 1903
Taxonomy articles created by Polbot